Twinbrook or Twin Brooks may refer to:

Twinbrook, Belfast, a district on the outskirts of West Belfast
Twinbrook (WMATA station), a Washington Metro station in Montgomery County, Maryland
Twinbrook (Rockville, Maryland), a subdivision of Rockville, Maryland
Twinbrook, a fictional town in The Sims 3: Ambitions
Twin Brooks, Edmonton, a neighborhood of Edmonton
Twin Brooks, South Dakota, a town in South Dakota